The 2016 Gdynia Sevens is the third and last tournament of the 2016 Sevens Grand Prix Series. It was held over the weekend of 16–17 July 2016.

Teams
12 teams participated in the tournament. In preparation for the 2016 Olympics, instead of England, Scotland, and Wales fielding individual teams, two unified Great Britain teams will compete.

 
  Development
 
 
  Royals
  Lions

Pool Stage

Pool A

Pool B

Pool C

Knockout stage

Bowl

Plate

Cup

References

Grand Prix 3
2016 in Polish sport
Sport in Gdynia
International rugby union competitions hosted by Poland
Rugby sevens in Poland